The Venezuelan Ministry of People's Power for Defense is the federal-level organization responsible for maintaining the Venezuelan armed forces. As of October 2014, this ministry is headed by General Vladimir Padrino López. The ministry coordinates numerous counter-narcotics operations (e.g., Operation Sierra through the CUFAN organ), helps perform various civil support and social development programs, and oversees the conventional military capabilities of Venezuela.

History
 1810 Established as War and Navy Bureau
 1863 Ministry of War
 1874 Ministry of War and Navy
 1946 Became Ministry of National Defense
 1951 Name amended to Ministry of Defense
 2007 Renamed Ministry of People's Power for Defense by presidential decree

Lists of Ministers of Defense

See also
Cabinet of Venezuela

References

External links
  Sitio oficial del Ministerio del Poder Popular para la Defensa de Venezuela y los Ex-Ministros
  Sitio oficial del Ejército Libertador (Venezuela)
  Sitio oficial de la Armada de la República Bolivariana de Venezuela
  Sitio oficial de la Aviación Militar de Venezuela
  Sitio oficial de la Guardia Nacional de Venezuela
  Sitio oficial de la Aviación del Ejército del Venezuela

Military of Venezuela
Defense
Venezuela